The 1958 Tulsa Golden Hurricane football team represented the University of Tulsa during the 1958 NCAA University Division football season. In their fourth year under head coach Bobby Dodds, the Golden Hurricane compiled a 7–3 record (2–2 against Missouri Valley Conference opponents), and finished in third place in the conference. The team's statistical leaders included Jerry Keeling with 698 passing yards, Ronnie Morris with 623 rushing yards, and Billy Neal with 200 receiving yards.

Schedule

References

Tulsa
Tulsa Golden Hurricane football seasons
Tulsa Golden Hurricane football